Ramseyer may refer to:

 André Ramseyer (1914–2007), Swiss sculptor
 Bill Ramseyer (?–), United States football coach
 Christian William Ramseyer (1875–1943), politician from the US state of Iowa
 Fritz Ramseyer (1840-1914), Basel missionary in Asante
 John Mark Ramseyer (1953–), professor of Japanese Legal Studies at Harvard Law School
 Rudolf Ramseyer (1897–1943), Swiss footballer

See also
Ramseyer+Jenzer, a Swiss manufacturing company
Ramseier
Ramseyer Memorial Presbyterian Church